Vogelbach may refer to:

Daniel Vogelbach, baseball player
Josh Vogelbach, American football player and coach
Vogelbach, Bruchmühlbach-Miesau, Germany